Mark Wurtz (October 31, 1964 – March 25, 2020) was an American professional golfer.

Wurtz was born in Yakima, Washington. He played college golf at the University of New Mexico and turned pro in 1986.

Wurtz played mini-tours and the Canadian Tour before earning his PGA Tour card for the 1994 season in Q School. Between 1994 and 2005, he played on both the PGA Tour and Nationwide Tour. On the PGA Tour (1994–95, 1998), his best finish was T-8 at the 1994 Motorola Western Open. On the Nationwide Tour (1996–97, 1999–2005), he won the 1997 Nike Shreveport Open.

Wurtz died at his home after a lengthy illness.

Professional wins (7)

Buy.com Tour wins (1)

Buy.com Tour playoff record (0–1)

Canadian Tour wins (2)

Other wins (4)
1992 California State Open
1999 Giusti Open (Oregon)
2000 Giusti Open (Oregon
2001 Southern Arizona Open

Results in major championships

CUT = missed the halfway cut
Note: Wurtz only played in the U.S. Open.

See also
1993 PGA Tour Qualifying School graduates
1994 PGA Tour Qualifying School graduates
1997 PGA Tour Qualifying School graduates

References

External links

American male golfers
New Mexico Lobos men's golfers
PGA Tour golfers
American golf instructors
Golfers from Washington (state)
Sportspeople from Yakima, Washington
1964 births
2020 deaths